ExifTool is a free and open-source software program for reading, writing, and manipulating image, audio, video, and PDF metadata. It is platform independent, available as both a Perl library (Image::ExifTool) and command-line application. ExifTool is commonly incorporated into different types of digital workflows and supports many types of metadata including Exif, IPTC, XMP, JFIF, GeoTIFF, ICC Profile, Photoshop IRB, FlashPix, AFCP and ID3, as well as the manufacturer-specific metadata formats of many digital cameras.

Metainformation encapsulation 
ExifTool implements its own open metadata format. It is designed to encapsulate metainformation from many sources, in binary or textual form, and bundle it together with any type of file. It can either be a single file, wrapping existing data, or used as a sidecar file, carrying for example Exif or XMP metadata.

Uses 
Websites and services that use ExifTool include:

 Advanced Renamer
 Flickr (to parse the metadata from uploaded images)
 Hugin
 Metadata++
 XnView
 Exif Fixer (calculates and adds 360-specific metadata to images)

Supported file formats
ExifTool can read, edit or create files with the following formats:

Reading support

 360 - GoPro 360 video (QuickTime-based)
 3FR - Hasselblad raw (TIFF-based)
 3G2, 3GP2 - 3rd Gen. Partnership Project 2 audio/video (QuickTime-based)
 3GP, 3GPP - 3rd Gen. Partnership Project audio/video (QuickTime-based)
 A - Unix static library code Archive
 AA - Audible Audiobook
 AAE - Apple edit information (XML PLIST-based)
 AAX - Audible Enhanced Audiobook (QuickTime-based)
 ACR - American College of Radiology ACR-NEMA (DICOM-like)
 AFM, ACFM, AMFM - Adobe (Composite/Multiple Master) Font Metrics
 AI, AIT - Adobe Illustrator (Template, PS or PDF)
 AIFF, AIF, AIFC - Audio Interchange File Format (Compressed)
 APE - Monkey's Audio
 ARQ - Sony Alpha Pixel-Shift raw (TIFF-based)
 ARW - Sony Alpha raw (TIFF-based)
 ASF - Microsoft Advanced Systems Format
 AVI - Audio Video Interleaved (RIFF-based)
 AVIF - AV1 Image File Format (QuickTime-based)
 BMP, DIB - Windows BitMaP / Device Independent Bitmap
 BPG - Better Portable Graphics
 BTF - BigTIFF (64-bit Tagged Image File Format)
 CHM - Microsoft Compiled HTML format
 COS - Capture One Settings (XML-based)
 CR2 - Canon Raw 2 (TIFF-based) (CR2 specification)
 CR3 - Canon Raw 3 (QuickTime-based) (CR3 specification)
 CRM - Canon RAW Movie (QuickTime-based)
 CRW, CIFF - Canon Raw Camera Image File Format (CRW specification)
 CS1 - Sinar CaptureShop 1-shot raw (PSD-based)
 CSV - Comma-Separated Values
 CZI - Zeiss Integrated Software RAW (ZISRAW)
 DCM, DC3, DIC, DICM - DICOM - Digital Imaging and Communications in Medicine
 DCP - DNG Camera Profile (DNG-like)
 DCR - Kodak Digital Camera Raw (TIFF-based)
 DFONT - Macintosh Data Fork Font
 DIVX - DivX media format (ASF-based)
 DJVU, DJV - DjVu image (AIFF-like)
 DNG - Digital Negative (TIFF-based)
 DOC, DOT - Microsoft Word Document/Template (FPX-like)
 DOCX, DOCM - Office Open XML Document (Macro-enabled)
 DOTX, DOTM - Office Open XML Document Template (Macro-enabled)
 DPX - Digital Picture Exchange
 DR4 - Canon DPP version 4 Recipe
 DSS, DS2 - Digital Speech Standard
 DYLIB - Mac OS X Mach-O executable and library files
 DV - Digital Video
 DVB - Digital Video Broadcasting (QuickTime-based)
 DVR-MS - Microsoft Digital Video Recording (ASF-based)
 EIP - Capture One Enhanced Image Package (ZIP-based)
 EPS, EPSF, PS - (Encapsulated) PostScript Format
 EPUB - Electronic Publication Format
 ERF - Epson Raw Format (TIFF-based)
 EXE, DLL - DOS/Windows executable and library files
 EXIF - Exchangeable Image File Format metadata (TIFF-based)
 EXR - Open EXR (Extended Range)
 EXV - Exiv2 metadata file (JPEG-based)
 F4A, F4B, F4P, F4V - Adobe Flash Player 9+ Audio/Video (Quicktime-based)
 FFF - Hasselblad Flexible File Format (TIFF-based)
 FFF - FLIR thermal image File Format
 FITS - Flexible Image Transport System
 FLA - Macromedia/Adobe Flash project (FPX-like)
 FLAC - Free Lossless Audio Codec
 FLIF - Free Lossless Image Format
 FLV - Flash Video
 FPF - FLIR Public image Format
 FPX - FlashPix image
 GIF - Compuserve Graphics Interchange Format
 GPR - GoPro Raw (DNG-based)
 GZ, GZIP - GNU ZIP compressed archive
 HDP, WDP, JXR - Windows HD Photo / Media Photo / JPEG XR (TIFF-based)
 HDR - Radiance RGBE (Red Green Blue Exponent) High Dynamic-Range
 HEIC, HEIF, HIF - High Efficiency Image Format (QuickTime-based)
 HTML, HTM, XHTML - (Extensible) HyperText Markup Language
 ICO, CUR - Windows Icon or Cursor
 ICC, ICM - International Color Consortium color profile
 ICS, ICAL - iCalendar Schedule
 IDML - Adobe InDesign Markup Language (ZIP/XML-based)
 IIQ - Phase One Intelligent Image Quality raw (TIFF-based)
 IND, INDD, INDT - Adobe InDesign Document/Template (XMP metadata only)
 INSP - Insta360 Picture (JPEG-based)
 INSV - Insta360 Video (QuickTime-based)
 INX - Adobe InDesign Interchange (XML-based, XMP metadata only)
 ISO - ISO 9660 disk image
 ITC - iTunes Cover Flow artwork
 J2C, J2K, JPC - JPEG 2000 codestream
 JP2, JPF, JPM, JPX - JPEG 2000 image (Compound/Extended)
 JPEG, JPG, JPE - Joint Photographic Experts Group image (see table below)
 JSON - JavaScript Object Notation
 JXL - JPEG XL (Extra longterm)
 K25 - Kodak DC25 raw (TIFF-based)
 KDC - Kodak Digital Camera raw (TIFF-based)
 KEY, KTH - Apple iWork '09 Keynote presentation/Theme
 LA - Lossless Audio (RIFF-based)
 LFP, LFR - Lytro Light Field Picture
 LNK - Microsoft Shell Link (Windows shortcut)
 LRV - Low-Resolution Video (QuickTime-based)
 M2TS, MTS, M2T, TS - MPEG-2 Transport Stream (used for AVCHD video)
 M4A, M4B, M4P, M4V - MPEG-4 Audio/Video (Quicktime-based)
 MACOS - MacOS "._" sidecar file (may have any extension)
 MAX - 3D Studio MAX (FPX-like)
 MEF - Mamiya (raw) Electronic Format (TIFF-based)
 MIE - Meta Information Encapsulation (MIE specification)
 MIFF, MIF - Magick Image File Format
 MKA, MKV, MKS - Matroska Audio/Video/Subtitle
 MOBI, AZW, AZW3 - Mobipocket electronic book (Palm-based)
 MODD - Sony Picture Motion metadata (XML PLIST-based)
 MOI - MOD Information file
 MOS - Creo Leaf Mosaic (TIFF-based)
 MOV, QT - Apple QuickTime Movie
 MP3 - MPEG-1 layer 3 audio (uses ID3 information)
 MP4 - Motion Picture Experts Group version 4 (Quicktime-based)
 MPC - Musepack Audio
 MPEG, MPG, M2V - Motion Picture Experts Group version 1 or 2
 MPO - Extended Multi-Picture format (JPEG with MPF extensions)
 MQV - Sony Mobile QuickTime Video
 MRW - Minolta Raw
 MXF - Material Exchange Format
 NEF - Nikon (raw) Electronic Format (TIFF-based)
 NMBTEMPLATE - Apple iWork '09 Numbers Template
 NRW - Nikon Raw (2) (TIFF-based)
 NUMBERS - Apple iWork '09 Numbers spreadsheet
 O - Unix compiled code Object
 ODB, ODC, ODF, ODG, ODI, ODP, ODS, ODT - Open Document Database/Chart/Formula/Graphics/Image/Presentation/Spreadsheet/Text (ZIP/XML-based)
 OFR - OptimFROG audio (RIFF-based)
 OGG, OGV - Ogg bitstream container
 ONP - ON1 Presets
 OPUS - Ogg Opus audio
 ORF - Olympus Raw Format (TIFF-based)
 OTF - Open Type Font
 PAC - Lossless Predictive Audio Compression (RIFF-based)
 PAGES - Apple iWork '09 Pages document
 PCD - Kodak Photo CD Image Pac
 PCX - PC Paintbrush
 PDB, PRC - Palm Database
 PDF - Adobe Portable Document Format
 PEF - Pentax (raw) Electronic Format (TIFF-based)
 PFA, PFB - PostScript Font ASCII/Binary
 PFM - Printer Font Metrics
 PGF - Progressive Graphics File
 PICT, PCT - Apple Picture file
 PLIST - Apple Property List (binary and XML formats)
 PMP - Sony DSC-F1 Cyber-Shot image
 PNG, JNG, MNG - Portable/JPEG/Multiple-image Network Graphics
 PPM, PBM, PGM - Portable Pixel/Bit/Gray Map
 PPT, PPS, POT - Microsoft PowerPoint Presentation/Slideshow/Template (FPX-like)
 POTX, POTM - Office Open XML Presentation Template (Macro-enabled)
 PPAX, PPAM - Office Open XML Presentation Addin (Macro-enabled)
 PPSX, PPSM - Office Open XML Presentation Slideshow (Macro-enabled)
 PPTX, PPTM - Office Open XML Presentation (Macro-enabled)
 PSD, PSB, PSDT - PhotoShop Drawing / Large Document / Template
 PSP, PSPIMAGE - Paint Shop Pro
 QTIF, QTI, QIF - QuickTime Image File
 R3D - Redcode raw video
 RA - RealAudio
 RAF - FujiFilm Raw Format
 RAM, RPM - RealAudio/Plug-in Metafile
 RAR - RAR Archive
 RAW - Kyocera Contax N Digital Raw
 RAW - Panasonic Raw (TIFF-based)
 RIFF, RIF - Resource Interchange File Format
 RM, RV, RMVB - Real Media/Video (Variable Bitrate)
 RSRC - Mac OS Resource
 RTF - Rich Text Format
 RW2 - Panasonic Raw 2 (TIFF-based)
 RWL - Leica Raw (TIFF-based)
 RWZ - Rawzor compressed image
 SEQ - FLIR Systems image Sequence
 SKETCH - Sketch design file
 SO - Unix ELF executable and Shared Object files
 SR2 - Sony Raw 2 (TIFF-based)
 SRF - Sony Raw Format (TIFF-based)
 SRW - Samsung Raw format (TIFF-based)
 SVG - Scalable Vector Graphics (XML-based)
 SWF - Shockwave Flash
 THM - Canon Thumbnail (JPEG)
 THMX - Office Open XML Theme
 TIFF, TIF - Tagged Image File Format
 TTF, TTC - True Type Font/Collection
 TORRENT - BitTorrent description file
 TXT - Text files
 VCF, VCARD - Virtual Card
 VOB - Video Object (MPEG-based)
 VRD - Canon DPP Recipe Data
 VSD - Microsoft Visio Drawing (FPX-like)
 WAV - Windows digital audio WAVeform (RIFF-based)
 WEBM - Google Web Movie (MKV-based)
 WEBP - Google Web Picture (RIFF-based)
 WMA, WMV - Windows Media Audio/Video (ASF-based)
 WTV - Windos recorded TV show
 WV - WavePack lossless audio (RIFF-based)
 X3F - Sigma/Foveon raw
 XCF - GIMP native image format
 XLS, XLT - Microsoft Excel Spreadsheet/Template (FPX-like)
 XLSX, XLSM, XLSB - Office Open XML Spreadsheet (Macro-enabled/Binary)
 XLTX, XLTM - Office Open XML Spreadsheet Template (Macro-enabled)
 XMP - Extensible Metadata Platform sidecar file
 ZIP - ZIP archive

Edit support

 360 - GoPro 360 video (QuickTime-based)
 3G2, 3GP2 - 3rd Gen. Partnership Project 2 audio/video (QuickTime-based)
 3GP, 3GPP - 3rd Gen. Partnership Project audio/video (QuickTime-based)
 AAX - Audible Enhanced Audiobook (QuickTime-based)
 AI, AIT - Adobe Illustrator (Template, PS or PDF)
 ARQ - Sony Alpha Pixel-Shift raw (TIFF-based)
 ARW - Sony Alpha raw (TIFF-based)
 AVIF - AV1 Image File Format (QuickTime-based)
 CR2 - Canon Raw 2 (TIFF-based) (CR2 specification)
 CR3 - Canon Raw 3 (QuickTime-based) (CR3 specification)
 CRM - Canon RAW Movie (QuickTime-based)
 CRW, CIFF - Canon Raw Camera Image File Format (CRW specification)
 CS1 - Sinar CaptureShop 1-shot raw (PSD-based)
 DCP - DNG Camera Profile (DNG-like)
 DNG - Digital Negative (TIFF-based)
 DR4 - Canon DPP version 4 Recipe
 DVB - Digital Video Broadcasting (QuickTime-based)
 EPS, EPSF, PS - (Encapsulated) PostScript Format
 ERF - Epson Raw Format (TIFF-based)
 EXIF - Exchangeable Image File Format metadata (TIFF-based)
 EXV - Exiv2 metadata file (JPEG-based)
 F4A, F4B, F4P, F4V - Adobe Flash Player 9+ Audio/Video (Quicktime-based)
 FFF - Hasselblad Flexible File Format (TIFF-based)
 FLIF - Free Lossless Image Format
 GIF - Compuserve Graphics Interchange Format
 GPR - GoPro Raw (DNG-based)
 HDP, WDP, JXR - Windows HD Photo / Media Photo / JPEG XR (TIFF-based)
 HEIC, HEIF, HIF - High Efficiency Image Format (QuickTime-based)
 ICC, ICM - International Color Consortium color profile
 IIQ - Phase One Intelligent Image Quality raw (TIFF-based)
 IND, INDD, INDT - Adobe InDesign Document/Template (XMP metadata only)
 INSP - Insta360 Picture (JPEG-based)
 JP2, JPF, JPM, JPX - JPEG 2000 image (Compound/Extended)
 JPEG, JPG, JPE - Joint Photographic Experts Group image (see table below)
 JXL - JPEG XL (Extra longterm)
 LRV - Low-Resolution Video (QuickTime-based)
 M4A, M4B, M4P, M4V - MPEG-4 Audio/Video (Quicktime-based)
 MEF - Mamiya (raw) Electronic Format (TIFF-based)
 MIE - Meta Information Encapsulation (MIE specification)
 MOS - Creo Leaf Mosaic (TIFF-based)
 MOV, QT - Apple QuickTime Movie
 MP4 - Motion Picture Experts Group version 4 (Quicktime-based)
 MPO - Extended Multi-Picture format (JPEG with MPF extensions)
 MQV - Sony Mobile QuickTime Video
 MRW - Minolta Raw
 NEF - Nikon (raw) Electronic Format (TIFF-based)
 NRW - Nikon Raw (2) (TIFF-based)
 ORF - Olympus Raw Format (TIFF-based)
 PDF - Adobe Portable Document Format
 PEF - Pentax (raw) Electronic Format (TIFF-based)
 PNG, JNG, MNG - Portable/JPEG/Multiple-image Network Graphics
 PPM, PBM, PGM - Portable Pixel/Bit/Gray Map
 PSD, PSB, PSDT - PhotoShop Drawing / Large Document / Template
 QTIF, QTI, QIF - QuickTime Image File
 RAF - FujiFilm Raw Format
 RAW - Panasonic Raw (TIFF-based)
 RW2 - Panasonic Raw 2 (TIFF-based)
 RWL - Leica Raw (TIFF-based)
 SR2 - Sony Raw 2 (TIFF-based)
 SRW - Samsung Raw format (TIFF-based)
 THM - Canon Thumbnail (JPEG)
 TIFF, TIF - Tagged Image File Format
 VRD - Canon DPP Recipe Data
 WEBP - Google Web Picture (RIFF-based)
 X3F - Sigma/Foveon raw
 XMP - Extensible Metadata Platform sidecar file

Creation support
 DR4 - Canon DPP version 4 Recipe
 EXIF - Exchangeable Image File Format metadata (TIFF-based)
 EXV - Exiv2 metadata file (JPEG-based)
 ICC, ICM - International Color Consortium color profile
 MIE - Meta Information Encapsulation (MIE specification)
 VRD - Canon DPP Recipe Data
 XMP - Extensible Metadata Platform sidecar file

Supported JPEG metadata 
ExifTool can read, edit or create the following types of metadata in JPEG images:

See also 

 Libsndfile see sndfile-info which displays audio file info

References

External links 
  (exiftool.org)
 Official website (sourceforge.net)
 ExifTool User Manual
 Image::ExifTool API Manual
 MIE file format – specification
 MIE Tags – reference
 Commentary on Meta Information Formats (or "Why this or that Format Sucks"), Phil Harvey, essay on design decisions, created Nov. 15, 2005, last revised Feb 4, 2020

Free photo software
Tag editors
2003 software
Free software programmed in Perl
Software using the Artistic license